The World Court, or the International Court of Justice (ICJ), is a UN court that settles disputes between nations.

Worls Court may also refer to:

Judicial courts
 International Criminal Court (ICC), a court in The Hague that prosecutes individuals for crimes against humanity and similar atrocities
 Permanent Court of Arbitration (PCA), in The Hague
 Permanent Court of International Justice (PCIJ; 1922–1946), an international court attached to the League of Nations
 any international court

Tennis court
Pro Tennis: World Court, a tennis arcade game

See also
 World Courts of Women